This is a list of transfers in Serbian football for the 2014 summer transfer window.
Only moves featuring a Serbian SuperLiga side are listed.
The order by which the clubs are listed is equal to the classification at the end of 2013–14 Serbian SuperLiga.

Serbian SuperLiga

Red Star Belgrade

In:

Out:

Partizan

In: 

Out:

Jagodina

In:

Out:

Vojvodina

In:

Out:

Čukarički

In:

Out:

Radnički Niš

In:

Out:

Voždovac

In:

Out:

Novi Pazar

In:

Out:

Napredak

In:

Out:

Spartak Subotica

In:

Out:

OFK Beograd

In:

Out:

Donji Srem

In:

Out:

Radnički 1923

In:

Out:

Rad

In:

Out:

Mladost Lučani

In:

Out:

Borac Čačak

In:

Out:

See also
Serbian SuperLiga
2014–15 Serbian SuperLiga

References

External links

Serbian SuperLiga
2014
transfers